Biso (887 – 909) was a Bishop of Paderborn.

Biso was born in the 9th century in the western part of the Duchy of Saxony. As the first bishop who was a freely elected cleric he was ordained on 2 May 887 by the Archbishop of Mainz, Liutbert. His investiture was presided over by King Charles the Fat. Biso was bishop from 887 to 9 September 909. He is interred in Paderborn Cathedral. During his time as bishop he dealt with eleven popes. He died on 9 September 909.

References

Literature
 Brandt/Hengst: Die Bischöfe von Paderborn
 

9th-century Saxon bishops
Roman Catholic bishops of Paderborn
9th-century births
10th-century deaths